Hercules Rowley, 2nd Viscount Langford (29 October 1737 – 24 March 1796), styled The Honourable Hercules Rowley between 1766 and 1791, was an Irish politician.

Rowley was the son of Hercules Rowley and Elizabeth Upton, 1st Viscountess Langford.

He was returned to the Irish House of Commons for both County Antrim and Downpatrick in 1783, but chose to sit for Antrim, a seat he held until 1791 when he succeeded his mother in the viscountcy and entered the Irish House of Lords. He was also elected for Longford Borough in 1783 and 1790, but again chose to sit for Antrim.

Lord Langford died unmarried in March 1796, aged 58. The viscountcy died with him.

References

1737 births
1796 deaths
Viscounts in the Peerage of Ireland
Irish MPs 1783–1790
Irish MPs 1790–1797
Members of the Parliament of Ireland (pre-1801) for County Antrim constituencies
Members of the Parliament of Ireland (pre-1801) for County Longford constituencies
Members of the Parliament of Ireland (pre-1801) for County Down constituencies